Magdalena Saint Antonin (born 8 July 1965) is an Argentine alpine skier. She competed in the women's slalom at the 1984 Winter Olympics.

References

1965 births
Living people
Argentine female alpine skiers
Olympic alpine skiers of Argentina
Alpine skiers at the 1984 Winter Olympics
Sportspeople from Bariloche